The 49th edition of the Vuelta a Colombia was held from June 13 to June 27, 1999.

Stages

1999-06-13: Circuito en Manizales (120 km)

1999-06-14: Manizales — Pereira (102.3 km)

1999-06-15: Armenia — Cali (179.3 km)

1999-06-16: Cali — Cartago (181.7 km)

1999-06-17: Cartago — La Pintada (164.6 km)

1999-06-18: Santa Fé de Antioquia — Alto del Toyó (78 km)

1999-06-19: Santa Fé de Antioquia — Edificio Inteligente (150 km)

1999-06-20: Medellín — Medellín (31.5 km)

1999-06-21: Bello — Puerto Berrío (177.4 km)

1999-06-22: Puerto Berrío — Barrancabermeja (159.8 km)

1999-06-23: Barrancabermeja — Bucaramanga (124.2 km)

1999-06-24: Bucaramanga — Barichara (148.7 km)

1999-06-25: San Gil — Tunja (188.3 km)

1999-06-26: Tunja — Zipaquirá (171.8 km)

1999-06-27: Circuito en Bogotá (100.8 km)

Final classification

See also 
 1999 Clásico RCN

References 
 cyclingnews
 pedalesybielas (Archived 2009-10-22)

1999
Colombia
1999 in Colombian sport
June 1999 sports events in South America